This page lists public opinion polls in connection with the 2018 Russian presidential election.

Graphic

Main opinion polls
Polls conducted since 8 February 2018, when all candidates were registered.

Most favorite for president

Least favorite for president

Early opinion polls
Polls conducted before the completion of the official registration of candidates.

Subnational polls

Moscow

Chukotka Autonomous Okrug

Jewish Autonomous Oblast

Magadan Oblast

Kamchatka Krai

Sakhalin Oblast

Amur Oblast

Yakutia

Khabarovsk Krai

Primorsky Krai

Impact of 2017 protests

On March 26, 2017, protests against alleged corruption in the federal Russian government took place simultaneously in many cities across the country. They were triggered by the lack of proper response from the Russian authorities to the published investigative film He Is Not Dimon To You by Alexei Navalny, which has garnered more than 20 million views on YouTube. The Levada Center survey showed that 38% of surveyed Russians supported protests and that 67 percent held Putin personally responsible for high-level corruption. A new wave of mass protests has been announced for June 12, 2017.

The Levada Center also conducted another survey, which was released on the April 6, 2017, showing Navalny's recognition among the Russian population at 55%. Out of all voters, 2% would "definitely" and 7% "perhaps" vote for him in the presidential election.

References

External links
FoRGO
WCIOM
Levada Centre
FOM
CIMES

2018 Russian presidential election
Presidential